The following is a list of the television networks and announcers who have broadcast college football's New Orleans Bowl throughout the years.

Television

Radio

References

New Orleans
Broadcasters
New Orleans
New Orleans
New Orleans
New Orleans-related lists